The Treaty of Le Goulet was signed by Kings John of England and Philip II of France in May 1200. It concerned bringing an end to the war over the Duchy of Normandy and finalising the new borders of what was left of the duchy. The treaty was a victory for Philip in asserting his legal claims to overlordship over John's French lands. A consequence of the treaty was the separation of the Channel Islands from Normandy.

The terms of the treaty signed at Le Goulet, an island in the middle of the Seine river near Vernon in Normandy, included clarifications of the feudal relationships binding the monarchs. Philip recognised John as King of England, heir to his brother Richard I, and thus formally abandoned his prior support for Arthur I, Duke of Brittany, the son of John's late brother, Geoffrey II of Brittany. John, meanwhile, formally recognised the new status of the lost Norman territories by acknowledging the Counts of Boulogne and Flanders as vassals of the kings of France, not those of England, and recognised Philip as the suzerain of the continental lands in the Angevin Empire. John also bound himself not to support any rebellions on the part of the counts of Boulogne and Flanders.

Philip had previously recognised John as suzerain of Anjou and the Duchy of Brittany, but with the treaty of le Goulet he extorted 20,000 marks sterling as "relief" in payment for recognition of John's sovereignty of Brittany.

The treaty also included territorial concessions by John to Philip. The Vexin (except for Les Andelys, where Château Gaillard, vital to the defence of the region, was located) and the Évrécin in Normandy, as well as Issoudun, Graçay, and the fief of André de Chauvigny in Berry were to be removed from Angevin suzerainty and put directly into that of France.

The Duchy of Aquitaine was not included in the treaty. It was still held by John as heir to his still-living mother, Eleanor. The treaty was sealed with a marriage alliance between the Angevin and Capetian dynasties. John's niece Blanche, daughter of his sister Leonora and Alfonso VIII of Castile, married Philip's eldest son, Louis VIII of France (to be eventually known as Louis the Lion). The marriage alliance only assured a strong regent for the minority of Louis IX of France. Philip declared John deposed from his fiefs for failure to obey a summons in 1202 and war broke out again. Philip moved quickly to seize John's lands in Normandy, strengthening the French throne in the process.

Sources
Labarge, Margaret Wade. Gascony, England's First Colony 1204–1453. London: Hamish Hamilton, 1980.

References

Treaties of medieval England
Treaties of the Kingdom of France
1200 in Europe
12th-century treaties
John, King of England
England–France relations